The Golden Ticket is an opera based on Roald Dahl's classic 1964 book Charlie and the Chocolate Factory by the contemporary American composer Peter Ash, with a libretto by Donald Sturrock. The Golden Ticket was commissioned by American Lyric Theater, Lawrence Edelson, Producing Artistic Director; and Felicity Dahl. It premiered at Opera Theatre of Saint Louis on June 13, 2010 in a co-production between OTSL, Ireland's Wexford Festival Opera, and American Lyric Theater.

History
The Golden Ticket was originally conceived as a project for London's Royal National Theatre, but early workshops initiated by the composer and librettist revealed the challenges of producing an opera under the auspices of a theater company that did not regularly employ classically trained singers.  An early concert version of the score was presented by the Manchester Camerata shortly thereafter. This concert was considered by most to be a failure, in part due to the fact that family audiences had expected a fully staged version of Charlie and the Chocolate Factory – not an opera in concert.  After receiving funding from the National Endowment for Science, Technology and the Arts in the UK, Ash and Sturrock created a 25-minute recording of excerpts of the opera to promote it to potential producers. In 2006, this recording came to the attention of American Lyric Theater's Producing Artistic Director, Lawrence Edelson, who commissioned the completion of the opera in partnership with Felicity Dahl, widow of Roald Dahl. American Lyric Theater developed the opera over a three-year period, including two extensive workshops in New York City, prior to partnering with Opera Theatre of Saint Louis in 2010 for the world premiere production.

Musical forces and language
The opera is written for a virtuoso chamber orchestra of 23 players, a cast of 12 principal singers, and a chorus of 24 adults with an optional children's chorus. No children's chorus was used in the World Premiere production.

Role distribution
Charlie: Treble
Willy Wonka: Bass Baritone or Baritone
Mike Teavee: Countertenor
Veruca Salt: Mezzo Soprano
Lord Salt: Baritone
Violet Beauregarde: Coloratura Soprano
Augustus Gloop: Tenor
Grandpa Joe: Tenor
Mr. Beauregarde/Grandpa George: Bass
Mrs. Gloop/Grandma Georgina: Dramatic Soprano
Mrs. Teavee/Grandma Josephine: Contralto or Mezzo Soprano
Candy Mallow/Squirrelmistress: Mezzo Soprano

Chorus solos:
Floor Manager
Camera Man
Herpes Trout
Marvin Prune
Miranda Grope
Salt Worker
Oompa Loompa

Chorus of gargoyles, townsfolk, Oompa Loompas, and squirrels

World premiere
The World Premiere Production Team and Cast:
Director: James Robinson
Conductor: Timothy Redmond
Scenic Design: Bruno Schwengl
Costume Design: Martin Pakledinaz
Choreographer: Seán Curran

A co-production between Opera Theatre of Saint Louis, American Lyric Theater, and Wexford Festival Opera.

Charlie: Michael Kepler Meo
Willy Wonka: Daniel Okulitch
Mike Teavee: David Trudgen
Veruca Salt : Jennifer Rivera
Lord Salt: David Kravitz
Violet Beauregarde: Tracy Dahl
Augustus Gloop: Andrew Drost
Grandpa Joe: Frank Kelley
Mr. Beauregarde/Grandpa George: Oren Gradus
Mrs. Gloop/Grandma Georgina: Kristin Clayton
Mrs. Teavee/Grandma Josephine: Mary Ann McCormick
Candy Mallow/Squirrelmistress: Jennifer Berkebile

Subsequent productions
The world premiere production is a co-production between Opera Theatre of Saint Louis, American Lyric Theater and Wexford Festival Opera. Wexford has scheduled the European premiere for October 2010. American Lyric Theater is expected to announce additional production plans in late 2010. The Atlanta Opera's production of The Golden Ticket was performed in March 2012.

Recording
The Atlanta Opera production was recorded in March 2012 with the following cast:

Benjamin P. Wenzelberg - Charlie
Daniel Okulitch - Willy Wonka/Mr. Know
Kristin Clayton - Grandma Georgina/Mrs. Gloop
Jamie Barton - Grandma Josephine/Mrs. Teavee
Keith Jameson - Grandpa Joe
Jason Hardy - Grandpa George/Mr. Beauregard
Gerald Thompson - Mike Teavee
Krista Costin - Candy Mallow/Squirrel Mistress
Abigail Nims - Veruca Salt
David Kravitz - Lord Salt
Ashley Emerson - Violet Beauregard
Andrew Drost - Augustus Gloop
Gabriel Couret - Floor Manager
Nathan Munson - Camera Man
Michael Jones - Herpes Trout
Lara Longworth - Mrs. Trout
Chase Davidson - Marvin Prune
Rebecca Shipley - Miranda Grope
Megan Mashburn - Salt Worker
Marc Porlier - Oompa Loompa

Chorus: Michael Arens, Kyle Barnes, Zachary Brown, C. Augustus Godbee, Zachary Heath, Brandon Odom, Stuart Schleuse, Beverly Blouin, Rebecca Blouin, Melissa Fontaine, Jennifer Hamilton, Brishelle Miller, Laura Porlier, Amanda Smolek, Elizabeth Stuk, Laurie Tossing, Michael Gaare, Grant Jones, Stephen McCool, Jason Royal, Iván Segovia

Orchestra: Peter Ciaschini, Helen Kim, William Johnston, Charae Krueger, Lyn DeRamus, James Zellers, Jeana Melilli, Kelly Bryant, David Philipsen, David Odom, John Warren, Jan Baker, Mike Muszynsji, David Bradley, Yvonne Toll, Hollie Lifshey, Jonathan Swygert, Mark McConnell, Richard Brady, Donald Strand, Michael Cebulski, Jeff Kershner, John Lawless, Susan Brady, Michael Spassov

Conductor: Peter Ash

Chorus Master: Walter Huff

Albany Records TROY 1381/2

Notes

Charlie and the Chocolate Factory
Operas by Peter Ash
English-language operas
Operas
2010 operas
Willy Wonka
Operas based on novels